Ebrié, or Cama (Caman, Kyama, Tchaman, Tsama, Tyama), is spoken by the Tchaman people in Ivory Coast and Ghana. It is a Potou language of the Kwa branch of the Niger–Congo family of languages.

Phonology

Phonemic Inventory 

The sounds [v] and [z] are marginal and occur only in loanwords.

There are no nasal consonant phonemes in Ebrié. Instead, the nasal vowels cause the voiced lenis consonant series [ɓ, ɗ, j, w] to assimilate into [m, n, ɲ, ŋʷ].

Tones 
Ebrié has two level tones (H and L) and a falling tone (HL). It also has floating tones, and the voiced fortis consonants have a tendency to lower the pitch of the low tone.

Morphology

Nominal Prefixes 
The noun class prefixes in Ebrié distinguish between certain homophones and between singular and plural forms. Originally, this system would have been more robust, as seen in other Niger-Congo languages.

The four nominal prefixes are á-, à-, ɛ̃́-, and ɛ̃̀-. The latter two, which are nasal vowels, can also be realized as syllabic nasals, transcribed as ɴ́- and ɴ̀- but written orthographically as <n>.

The second noun in a compound retains its prefix, as shown below.

 cámã́ 'the Ebriés' + ńcã̀ 'language' → cámã́ǹcã̀ 'Ebrié language'
 átɛ̃̀ 'fire' + ńtʰù 'sand' → ńtɛ̃̀ǹtʰù 'ash'

Plural Nouns 
Nouns can be made plural through the use of nominal prefixes or plural suffixes. Certain nouns are irregular or invariable.

When a singular noun begins with the prefix á- or à-, its plural form will have the prefix ń- or ǹ- respectively. If a singular noun lacks a prefix, it will often have the prefix ń- in the plural. Other nouns take one of the plural suffixes -má̃, -hɔ̃̀, or -má̃hɔ̀̃. 

 áyá /ájá/ 'tree' → ńyá /ńjá/ 'trees'
 agban /àg͡bã́/ 'plate' → ngbán /ǹg͡bã́/ 'plates
 lalabhô [làlàɓô] 'duck' → ńlalabho [ńlàlàɓô] 'ducks'
 mmanhɔn [m̀mã̀hɔ̀̃] 'mothers'
 nmyahɔn [ǹmjã̂hɔ̃̀] 'spouses'

Subject Pronouns 
In Ebrié, tense/aspect/mood markers are found on the verb or as separate morphemes if the subject is a noun or a plural subject pronoun. The singular subject pronouns merge with the TAM markers, resulting in morphophonemic changes. 

For exampleːmɛ̃̀ (1SG) + ɓâ (FUT) → mã̀ã́ (1SG.FUT)

Syntax 
Ebrié is a SVO language, as seen in the following example.jàjó étʰà kpã́hɔ̃̀

Yayo chew.PROG bread

'Yayo eats bread.'

Orthography 

The high tone is marked with the acute accent (ájí 'respect'), and the low tone is left unmarked (aji 'clay'). The falling tone is marked with a circumflex (â).

The apostrophe (') is used to mark the habitual form of the verb.

References

Potou–Tano languages
Languages of Ivory Coast